PCD Live from London is the first video album by American girl group the Pussycat Dolls. It was directed by Jeff Gripe and Ginger Ramsey-Grippe, and was executively produced by Ron Fair and Jimmy Iovine. It was first released  on December 1, 2006, by A&M Records. The DVD features their concert at Windsor Racecourse in London, United Kingdom, as part of the Vodafone TBA secret gigs. It also features six music videos, backstage footage and candid interviews with each member.

Live from London debuted within the top twenty on three national music video charts. The DVD was certified platinum by the Australian Recording Industry Association and Music Canada. It was also certified gold by the Brazilian Association of Record Producers and the Recording Industry Association of New Zealand.

Background and development 
Live from London was filmed at Windsor Racecourse, London, as part of the Vodafone secret gigs. Most of the songs on Live from London originate from their debut album PCD, but it also contains an interlude titled "Show Me What You Got", which was written by Nicole Scherzinger and Polow da Don where they engage in a sing-song dance game whilst individually introducing themselves and their talents at hand.

Reception 
People magazine contributors Chuck Arnold and Ivory Jeff Clinton wrote that the Pussycat Dolls "[push] all the right buttons" and described the live performance as "fun" and "frivolous." On the contrary, Tony Clayton-Lea of the Irish Times wrote that the group come as "trailer-trash cousins" in comparison to fellow girl groups, Sugababes and Girls Aloud. He continued writing that the Pussycat Dolls are about fulfilling male fantasies with "push-up bras, stilettos and various other accouterments." He criticized the live performance for being "tatty, amateur and, questionably, overtly sexually provocative." However, Clayton-Lea praised the group's catalog, highlighting "Stickwitu" "as one of the best pop ballads of recent years."

In the United States, PCD Live from London debuted and peaked at number 12 on the Music Video Sales chart on December 23, 2006. It spent a total of 12 weeks on the chart. On the ARIA Top 40 Music DVDs chart in Australia, the DVD debuted at number 13 on the week commencing December 11, 2006. It remained in the top 40 for 22 non-consecutive weeks, before reappearing in June 2009 and achieving a new peak of 12. It was certified platinum by the Australian Recording Industry Association (ARIA) for selling 7,500 copies. PCD Live from London moderately in select European countries; it debuted and peaked at numbers 20 and 24 on the Czech Republic Music DVD and Music DVD Top 30 in the Netherlands respectively. In the United Kingdom, PCD Live from London debuted at number 26 on the Official Video Chart, a list compiled by the Official Charts Company on the week ending December 16, 2006. Four weeks later the DVD attained a peak of 24.

Track listing

Credits and personnel 
Credits adapted from the liner notes of PCD Live from London. Live performance and interview footage are courtesy of Vodafone TBA.

Recording and editing
Edited at Cut + Run, Santa Monica, California.
Bonus content mixed at Lime Studios, Santa Monica, California
Mastered at Bernie Grundman Mastering.

Personnel 

Art credits
Jeff Grippe – DVD creative direction
Anthony Mandler – photography
Julian Peploe – package design 
Ginger Ramsey-Grippe – DVD creative direction

PCD interviews
Mace Cahme – producer
Donn Viola – director

Music videos
Michael Angelos – producer (track 14)
Chris Applebaum – director (track 13)
Benny Boom – director (track 11)
Nigel Dick – director (track 10)
Nina Dluhy – producer (track 10)
John Hardin – producer (track 13)
Paul Hunter – director (track 9)
Francis Lawrence – director (track 12)
Ron Mohrhoff – producer (track 9)
Roger Ubina – producer (track 11)
Marc Webb – director (track 14)
Lynn Zekanis – producer (track 12)

Audio mixing credits
Robin Antin – co-producer
Ron Fair – showtape producer
Brian Gardner – mastering
Michael Minden – co-producer
Brian Malouf – mixing and Pro Tools editing
Polow da Don – showtape producer

Editing credits
Franco Castilla – assistant editor
Luc Giddens – assistant editor
Chris Gigard – producer
Jeff Grippe – editing
Thomas Han – additional editing
Kimberly Hoffman – assistant editor
Erin Nordstorm – additional editing
Jen Tiexiera – additional editing
Megan Welsh – producer

Tour credits
Joe Bonanno – video director live 
Zac Cromwell – lightning tech
Bryan "Froggy" Cross – tour manager, production manager, audio engineer
Dustin Delker – audio system tech
Roy Fountain – video tech
Sara Gepp – audio system tech
Brian Graham – audio system tech
Barry Lather – creative designer 
Charity Lomax – road manager
Scott Warner – lightning designer

Charts

Certifications

Release history

References

The Pussycat Dolls albums
Albums produced by Ron Fair
2006 video albums
Live video albums